Gradiște is a commune in Cimișlia District. It is composed of two villages, Gradiște and Iurievca.

Notable people
 Gheorghe Șalaru

References

Communes of Cimișlia District